Pinkus Abortion Technician is the 23rd album by American rock band Melvins, released on April 20, 2018 through Ipecac Recordings. It features both "ongoing" bass player Steven McDonald and "occasional bottom ender" Jeff Pinkus, who receives writing credit on four of the album's five original songs. The title is a direct reference to the Butthole Surfers album Locust Abortion Technician.

Critical reception

Pinkus Abortion Technician was met with "generally favorable" reviews from critics. At Metacritic, which assigns a weighted average rating out of 100 to reviews from mainstream publications, it received an average score of 69 based on 10 reviews. Aggregator Album of the Year gave the release a 63 out of 100 based on a critical consensus of 11 reviews.

Track listing

Personnel
King Buzzo – guitar, vocals
Dale Crover – drums, guitar, vocals, piano
Steve McDonald – bass, vocals
Jeff Pinkus – bass, banjo, vocals
with
Tom Hazelmyer – special guest musician

Additional personnel
Toshi Kasai – engineer
Mackie Osborne – cover drawing & layout
Tom Hazelmyer – clown illustrations

References

Melvins albums
2018 albums
Ipecac Recordings albums